Man to Man may refer to:

Film
 Man to Man (1922 film), an American Western
 Man to Man (1930 film), an American drama
 Man to Man (1992 film), a British television film by Manfred Karge in the anthology series ScreenPlay
 Man to Man (2005 film), a historical drama

Television
 Man to Man with Dean Learner, a 2006 British comedy television show
 James Brown: Man to Man, a 1968 television special featuring James Brown
 "Man to Man", MGM Television sports talk program with Eddie Carroll and Jamie Farr
 "Man to Man", an episode of Frontier Doctor
 Man to Man (TV series), a 2017 South Korean television series

Music
 Man 2 Man, a band from New York City
Man To Man, box set by Bob Marley and The Wailers JAD/Universal 
 Man to Man (album), 1976 album and title song by Hot Chocolate
 "Man to Man" (Gary Allan song), a 2003 song by Gary Allan, written by Jamie O'Hara
"Man To Man", song recorded by Hank Williams, Jr. from his 1990 album Lone Wolf
"Man To Man", song by Bob Marley and The Wailers, reissued on Hall of Fame: A Tribute to Bob Marley's 50th Anniversary
"Man To Man", first single of The Cherry Boys, 1981
"Man To Man", song by Scotch, 1987
"Man To Man", song by Dorian Electra, 2019

Other uses
Man-to-man defense, a type of defensive used in team sports
Man-to-man wargame, a wargame

See also
One on One (disambiguation)